Acallis alticolalis is a species of snout moth in the genus Acallis. It was described by Harrison Gray Dyar Jr. in 1910, and is known from North America, including New Hampshire and Virginia.

References

Moths described in 1910
Chrysauginae
Moths of North America
Taxa named by Harrison Gray Dyar Jr.